Sonia Wieder-Atherton (born 1961) is a Franco-American classical cellist.

Life 
Born in San Francisco of a Romanian mother and an American father of Jewish origin, she grew up in New York and then in Paris where she entered the Conservatoire de Paris in Maurice Gendron's class. She is the sister of Claire Atherton.

After her studies at the Conservatoire de Paris in the cello classes of Maurice Gendron and chamber music of Jean Hubeau, she studied with Mstislav Rostropovich, then two years at the Moscow Conservatory with Natalia Shakhovskaya.

In 1986, she was a laureate of the concours de violoncelle Rostropovitch.

From then on, she played as a soloist with the Orchestre de Paris, the Orchestre national de France, the National Orchestra of Belgium, the Orchestre Philharmonique de Liège, the Israel Philharmonic Orchestra, the Gulbenkian Orchestra of Lisbonne, the Orchestre de Chambre de Lausanne, the Luxembourg Philharmonic Orchestra.

She is regularly invited by major international festivals.

Composers dedicate works to her: Henri Dutilleux, Georges Aperghis (Le reste du temps, Profils for the duo she forms with Françoise Rivalland), Pascal Dusapin (including a cello concerto, Cello), Betsy Jolas, Ivan Fedele.

In chamber music, she plays with pianists Imogen Cooper, Jean-Claude Pennetier, Laurent Cabasso, cellists Raphaël Oleg and Silvia Marcovici, the violist Gérard Caussé, percussionist Françoise Rivalland. In 1999, the Académie des beaux-arts (France) awards her the Grand Prix Del Duca.

She is also a composer and occasionally arranger, notably for her disc A Couch in New York (by Chantal Akerman). She composed the original music for the film  by Benoît Barbier).

On October 4, 2014, she participated in that year edition of Nuit blanche in Paris.

In 2015, she was made an Ordre des Arts et des Lettres.

On 1 July 2018, she performed pieces composed by Gabriel Fauré, David Zahavi, Max Bruch, Ludwig van Beethoven, Serguei Rachmaninov, Jean-Sébastien Bach at the entrance ceremony to the Panthéon of Simone Veil and her husband Antoine.

Premieres 
In recent years, Wieder-Atherton has been at the origin of many projects that she designs and stages:
 Chants juifs, a cycle for cello and piano where she is inspired by the art of the hazan.
 Chants d’Est, for cello and instrumental ensemble, conceived as a journey from Russia Mitteleuropa.
 Vita, for solo cello and three cellos, where she tells the story of Angioletta-Angel's life through two geniuses out of their time, Monteverdi and Scelsi.
 Odyssée for cello and imaginary choir, a woman alone with her cello accompanied by a soundtrack, confronts the elements. Wind, waves, chaos, storms...
 Little Girl Blue, by Nina Simone, with piano and percussions.

In addition, there are projects such as: 
 D'Est en musique, a show created with the images from the film D’Est by Chantal Akerman.
 Danses nocturnes, with Charlotte Rampling, where the works of Benjamin Britten and Sylvia Plath meet.
 Navire Night, by Marguerite Duras, with Fanny Ardant.

Discography 
 Little Girl Blue, from Nina Simone, Naïve Records, 2014, with Bruno Fontaine and Laurent Kraif
 Vita Monteverdi Scelsi, Naïve, 2011
 Jewish songs, Naïve, 2010
 Chants d'Est sur le sentier recouvert, Naïve, 2009
 Brahms - Bach, Sony-BMG, 2007
 En Concerto, Sony-BG, 2006
 Rachmaninov : après un rêve, with Imogen Cooper, Sony-BMG, 2002
 Au commencement Monteverdi, Sony-BMG, 2001
 Schubert Trios / Arpeggione Sonata, Sony-BMG, 1998
 L'Ecclesiaste, with Sami Frey, RCA, 1996
 Un Divan à New York (B.O.F), RCA, 1996

Participation 
 Château de sable, on Jacques Higelin's album Beau Repaire, 2013

References

External links 
 
 Sonia Wieder-Atherton (France Musique)
 Sonia Wieder-Atherton (France Culture)
 La violoncelliste qui joue avec les mots, Le Monde, 28 September 2013
 L'Atelier de Sonia Wieder-Atherton, violoncelliste, France Inter, 16 March 2013
 Sonia Wieder-Atherton (Salle Gaveau)
 Sonia Wieder-Atherton : Une œuvre me reste et est réussie si elle m'amène ailleurs, in the Les Masterclasses program on France Culture, 11 July 2018  
 Sonia Wieder-Atherton's YouTube channel

1961 births
Living people
Musicians from San Francisco
French women classical cellists
20th-century French composers
Conservatoire de Paris alumni
Moscow Conservatory alumni
Chevaliers of the Ordre des Arts et des Lettres
21st-century French musicians
20th-century American women musicians
21st-century American women musicians
20th-century women composers
20th-century French women
21st-century French women
20th-century cellists
21st-century cellists